Joseph André Denis Savard (born February 9, 1953) is a Canadian former professional ice hockey center. He featured in the 1974 Stanley Cup Final with the Boston Bruins.

Playing career
Savard played 790 National Hockey League games for Boston Bruins, Buffalo Sabres and Quebec Nordiques.  He was drafted sixth overall in the 1973 NHL Amateur Draft by the Boston Bruins.  He tallied 482 points (211 goals, 271 assists) during his career.

He served as head coach of the Quebec Nordiques. Savard was also a scout for the Ottawa Senators from 1994–1999 before being named an assistant coach for Ottawa. He was the general manager of the Montreal Canadiens from November 20, 2000, until the end of the 2002–2003 regular season when he stepped aside to allow Bob Gainey to become general manager. He then spent the following three years as Montreal's assistant GM. He was hired as an assistant coach for the Pittsburgh Penguins on July 3, 2006, working under head coach Michel Therrien, whom he had fired while GM of Montreal.

Career statistics

NHL Coaching statistics

Personal
Savard and his wife, Marie-France, have two sons, Patrick and Dany.

External links

1953 births
Boston Bruins draft picks
Boston Bruins players
Buffalo Sabres players
Canadian ice hockey centres
Ice hockey people from Quebec
Living people
Montreal Canadiens executives
National Hockey League first-round draft picks
Ottawa Senators coaches
Ottawa Senators scouts
People from Abitibi-Témiscamingue
Pittsburgh Penguins coaches
Pittsburgh Penguins scouts
Quebec Nordiques (WHA) draft picks
Quebec Nordiques coaches
Quebec Nordiques personnel
Quebec Nordiques players
Quebec Remparts players
Rochester Americans players
New Jersey Devils scouts
World Hockey Association first round draft picks
Canadian ice hockey coaches